Higashi is the Japanese word for east. In kanji it is represented as 東.

Higashi may also refer to:

Places
Higashi, Shibuya, a district of Shibuya, Tokyo
Higashi, Fukushima, a village in Fukushima Prefecture
Higashi, Okinawa, a village in Okinawa Prefecture
Higashi-ku is the name of wards of four cities:
Higashi-ku, Fukuoka, a ward of Fukuoka
Higashi-ku, Hiroshima, a ward of Hiroshima
Higashi-ku, Nagoya, a ward of Nagoya
Higashi-ku, Sapporo, a ward of Sapporo

People with the surname
Junya Higashi, Japanese footballer
Keigo Higashi, Japanese footballer
Kelly Higashi, American judge and lawyer
Koichi Higashi, Japanese footballer
Kotaro Higashi, Japanese footballer
, Japanese boxer
, Japanese footballer

Fictional characters
 Joe Higashi, a character from SNK's Fatal Fury and King of Fighters series
 Kotaro Higashi, an alter ego of Ultraman Taro from the 1973 tokusatsu series of the same name.
 Setsuna Higashi, a character in Fresh Pretty Cure!

Other uses
 Higashi (food), Japanese confectionery
 One of the Maug Islands

See also
Azuma (disambiguation) (The Japanese character for east is also pronounced azuma)
East (disambiguation)

Japanese-language surnames